Polytechnic Stadium may refer to:

 Polytechnic Stadium (Kremenchuk)
 Polytechnic Stadium (London)